Hong Kong Godfather is a 1985 Hong Kong action film written and directed by Wang Lung-wei, who also served as action director and appears in a supporting role, and starring Bryan Leung.

Plot
Mad Wai (Bryan Leung) is a former triad member who has retired from the underworld to raise his daughter after his wife died. When rival triad Jiaxi Lan (Wong Chun), who led a gang in Chinatown, Manhattan, decides to take over territories in East Tsim Sha Tsui belonging to Wai's former boss Han (Shih Kien), Lan manipulates Han's cowardly underling Rotten Chi (Shum Wai) to betray and kill his boss. Upon hearing the death, Wai vows to seek vengeance for Han. At this time, Lan also kidnaps Wai's daughter. Wai, alongside his old friends Playboy Lung (Norman Chu) and Sergeant Lam (Richard Cheung), engage in a bloody battle against Lan to avenge their former boss and save Wai's beloved daughter.

Cast
Bryan Leung as Mad Wai
Norman Chui as Playboy Lung
Richard Cheung as Sergeant Lam
Shum Wai as Rotten Chi
Wong Chun as Jiaxi Lan
Shih Kien as Boss Han
Kong Lung as Ting No. 3
Joyce Tsui as Connie
Hon Lai-fan as Boss Han's relative
Fong Yue as Boss Han's wife
Chui Fat as Lan's hitman
Patrick Gamble as Lan's hitman
Wayne Archer as Lan's hitman
Paula Tocha as Lan's hitman
Wang Lung-wei as Lan's hitman
Pomson Shi as Lan's hitman
Ken Boyle as Police Commissioner
Yat Poon-chai as Officer
Luk Ying-hung as Officer
Fung King-man as Uncle Chin
Kam Tin-chue as Uncle Te
Huang Pa-ching as Uncle
Titus Ho as Chan Hao
Chui Kin-wah as Bus driver
Chan Ming-wai as Boss Han's thug
Lam Moon-wah as Han's bodyguard
Chung Wing as Han's bodyguard
Tang Chiu-yau as Han's bodyguard
Kong Lung as Han's bodyguard
Chang Sing-kwong as Han's bodyguard
Wong Chi-keung as Victim at casino
Chan Hung as Casino fighter
Cho Yuen-tat as Boss Han's man
Lee Yiu-king as Boss Han's man
Lee Fat-yuen as Security guard
Tong Pau-chung as Security guard 	
Yee Tin-hung as Security guard
Lung Ying as Security guard
Chan Kwok-keung as Security guard
Nai Tim-choi as Lan's thug
Stephen Chan as Lan's thug
Ho Wing-cheung as Lan's thug
Ting Tong-chi
Errol Chan
Lau Chi-ming as Security guard
Wong Wai-fai
Lam Fu-wai
Yiu Man-kei

Reception

Critical
Hong Kong Godfather received generally positive reviews. Jean Lukitush of Kung Fu Cinema rated the film three and half stars out of five and gave a positive review praising its brutal and realistic action scenes and the performance of the cast. Paul Taggart of Far East Films rated the three out of five stars and writes "Hong Kong Godfather keeps it straight and simple, offering bloody thrills with a cast and crew honed on kung fu movies smashing their way into the gangster arena."

On the other hand, Roy Hrab of DVD Verdict gave the film a mixed review and writes "Gratuitous nudity, extreme violence, plentiful bloodletting, cheesy sets, even cheesier fashion, discount special effects, and lousy acting; it's all on display in Hong Kong Godfather, a Shaw Brothers production that makes for a fairly entertaining distraction."

Box office
The film grossed HK$3,213,478 at the Hong Kong box office during its theatrical run 27 October to 8 November 1985 in Hong Kong.

References

External links

Hong Kong Godfather at Hong Kong Cinemagic

1985 films
1985 action thriller films
1985 martial arts films
1985 crime drama films
Hong Kong action thriller films
Hong Kong martial arts films
Triad films
1980s Cantonese-language films
Shaw Brothers Studio films
Films set in Hong Kong
Films set in New York City
Films shot in Hong Kong
Hong Kong films about revenge
1980s Hong Kong films